Olios lepidus is a species of huntsman spider, found in Brazil.

References

Sparassidae
Spiders of Brazil
Spiders described in 1924